In military terms, 116th Brigade or 116th Infantry Brigade may refer to:

 116th Brigade (United Kingdom), a unit of the British Army during the First World War
 116th Indian Infantry Brigade, a unit of the British Indian Army during the Second World War
 116th Mixed Brigade, a unit of the Spanish Republican Army during the Spanish Civil War
 116th Infantry Brigade Royal Marines, a unit of the British Royal Marines during the Second World War
 116th Cavalry Brigade Combat Team (United States), a unit of the Idaho Army National Guard in the United States Army 
 116th Infantry Brigade Combat Team (United States), a unit of the Virginia Army National Guard in the United States Army
 116th Military Intelligence Brigade (United States), a unit of the United States Army
 116th Territorial Defense Brigade (Ukraine), a unit of the Ukrainian Territorial Defense Forces